2018 college football season may refer to:

American leagues
2018 NCAA Division I FBS football season
2018 NCAA Division I FCS football season
2018 NCAA Division II football season
2018 NCAA Division III football season
2018 NAIA football season

Non-American leagues
2018 Japan college football season
2018 U Sports football season